The Anti-Partition of Ireland League was a political organisation based in Northern Ireland.  Founded in 1948, it campaigned for a united Ireland in both Northern Ireland and the Republic of Ireland.

The group stood candidates in several elections in the North and the Republic but without success and it was disbanded in October 1950.

See also
Anti-Partition of Ireland League
Nationalist Party (Ireland)

Irish republican parties
Defunct political parties in Northern Ireland
Defunct political parties in the Republic of Ireland
Political parties established in 1948
Political parties disestablished in 1950
All-Ireland political parties